The 2018 Pac-12 Football Championship Game was played on November 30, 2018 at Levi's Stadium in Santa Clara, California to determine the champion of the Pac-12 Conference in football for the 2018 season. It was the eighth edition of the Pac-12 Football Championship Game and was televised nationally by Fox Sports. Washington defeated Utah 10–3 to win their second conference title in the Pac-12 era. The Huskies went on to represent the Pac-12 Conference in the 2019 Rose Bowl game.

History
Washington played in its second Pac-12 Football Championship Game while Utah made its debut. With Utah's qualification, all six members of the South Division have now appeared in the Pac-12 championship.

The matchup was the 13th meeting between the Utes and the Huskies. They last played each other earlier in the season when Washington defeated Utah 21–7 at Rice–Eccles Stadium. Following that result, Washington led the all-time series 11–1.

Teams

Utah

After starting 0–2 in conference play, Utah won six of their remaining seven conference games, officially clinching the South Division with a win against Colorado on November 17.

Washington

Washington claimed the North Division's berth in the championship game by winning their head-to-head matchup with Washington State in the 111th Apple Cup. The two rivals finished with 7–2 conference records.

Game summary

Scoring summary

Statistics

See also
 List of Pac-12 Conference football champions
 Stanford–USC football rivalry

References

Championship
Pac-12 Football Championship Game
Utah Utes football games
Washington Huskies football games
Sports competitions in Santa Clara, California
American football competitions in California
Pac-12 Football
Pac-12 Football